The Civil Rights Act of 1960 is a United States federal law that established federal inspection of local voter registration polls and introduced penalties for anyone who obstructed someone's attempt to register to vote. It dealt primarily with discriminatory laws and practices in the segregated South, by which African Americans and Mexican-American Texans had been effectively disenfranchised since the late 19th and start of the 20th century. This was the fifth Civil Rights Act to be enacted in United States history. Over an 85-year period, it was preceded only by the Civil Rights Act of 1957, whose shortcomings largely influenced its creation. This law served to more effectively enforce what was set forth in the 1957 act through eliminating certain loopholes in it, and to establish additional provisions. Aside from addressing voting rights, the Civil Rights Act of 1960 also imposed criminal penalties for obstruction of court orders to limit resistance to the Supreme Court's school desegregation decisions, arranged for free education for military members' children, and banned the act of fleeing to avoid prosecution for property damage. The Civil Rights Act of 1960 was signed into law by President Dwight D. Eisenhower.

Background

Reconstruction Era 
In American history, the Reconstruction era was the period from 1865-1877 following the end of the American Civil War. This period was marked by various attempts made to redress the inequities imposed on African Americans through slavery. As a result, the Thirteenth, Fourteenth, and Fifteenth Amendments of the United States Constitution were ratified. These amendments were established to provide African Americans the same civil rights as white Americans, and are collectively referred to as the Reconstruction Amendments. This time period marked the beginnings of the Civil Rights Movement.

Mid and Post-Reconstruction 
By 1873, Supreme Court decisions began to limit the scope of Reconstruction legislation, and many whites resorted to intimidation and violence to undermine African Americans' voting rights. The Compromise of 1877, an informal agreement to resolve a political dispute, marked the end of the Reconstruction era. Southern Democrats largely stopped adhering to the provisions of Reconstruction legislation, ceasing to intervene in Southern voting practices, which prompted widespread disenfranchisement of African American voters. The Jim Crow Laws were established during the 19th century and served to block African American votes, ban integration in public facilities such as schools, and forbid interracial marriage in the South. The enactment of these laws was able to vastly undermine the progress toward equality which was made during the Reconstruction era.

Public Opinion 
During the 1950s, much of United States public opinion was still marked by a resistant attitude toward desegregation and racial equality, particularly in the South. Near the end of the decade, however, activists and proponents of the Civil Rights Movement had begun pressuring Congress to enact legislation which would more effectively protect the constitutional civil rights of African Americans.

Brown v. Board of Education 
On May 17, 1954, the Supreme Court unanimously declared and established that racial segregation within schools was unconstitutional. This was the final outcome of Brown v. Board of Education.

Subsequently, Southern white political leaders sought to defy the decision. Senator Harry Byrd of Virginia, the head of the Byrd Machine (Virginia's most influential political organization), described the decision as "the most serious blow that has yet been struck against the rights of the states in a matter vitally affecting their authority and welfare.” Two years after the decision, Senator Byrd had gathered almost 100 Southern politicians' signatures for his Southern Manifesto, an agreement to resist the decision. On February 25, 1956, he proposed Massive Resistance, a set of laws created in efforts to block integration.

Aside from politicians, large groups of Southern white Americans also mobilized in efforts to prevent integration. Some white citizens elected to educate their children through private academies, which initially ran on public funds until this was found faulty in court. Some of these citizens also used threats of violence to intimidate black families.

The Civil Rights Act of 1957 
By 1957, only about 20% of African Americans were registered to vote, largely due to the active disenfranchisement they had been facing. That year, President Eisenhower sent Congress a proposal for civil rights legislation. As a result, the Civil Rights Act of 1957 was enacted by the 85th Congress. This was the first federal civil rights law enacted since the Civil Rights Act of 1875, and was the first major piece of civil rights legislation passed by Congress. The Civil Rights Act of 1957 was also signed into law by President Dwight D. Eisenhower on September 9, 1957.

While aiming to enforce the voting rights of African Americans set out in the Fifteenth Amendment of the United States Constitution, the 1957 act had several loopholes that allowed civil rights resistors to continue preventing minorities from exercising their right to vote. Southern states continued to discriminate against African Americans in application of voter registration and electoral laws, in segregation of school and public facilities, and in employment, despite the orders of the law. As the law had not resolved these issues, its outcomes highlighted a need for improved civil rights legislation, which was later fulfilled in part by the Civil Rights Act of 1960.

Presidential Involvement

President Dwight D. Eisenhower 
Toward the end of his presidency, President Eisenhower publicly supported civil rights legislation. In his message to Congress on February 5, 1959, he called for further advancements within it, stating that “every individual regardless of his race, religion, or national origin is entitled to the equal protection of the laws." Within this message, he proposed a mandate including seven recommendations for the protection of civil rights, as listed below.

Eisenhower's Mandate 
Strengthen the laws that would root out threats to obstruct court orders in school desegregation cases
Provide more investigative authority to the Federal Bureau of Investigation in crimes involving the destruction of schools/churches
Grant Attorney General power to investigate Federal election records
Provide temporary program for aid to agencies to assist changes necessary for school desegregation decisions
Authorize provision of education for children of the armed forces
Consider establishing a statutory Commission on Equal Job Opportunity Under Government Contracts (later mandated in the Civil Rights Act of 1964 to create the Equal Employment Opportunity Commission)
Extend the Civil Rights Commission an additional two years

State of the Union Address 
In the annual presidential State of the Union speech on January 7, 1960, Eisenhower spoke out about the necessity for advancement in civil rights legislation, referencing constitutionality as justification. He discussed the fact that some citizens were still deprived of their right to vote, despite constitutional guarantees, and that protecting this right should be a top priority. With reference to the recommendations he made to Congress, he stated, "I trust that Congress will thus signal to the world that our Government is striving for equality under law for all our people."

Statement Upon Signing 
President Eisenhower also issued a statement upon signing the Civil Rights Act of 1960, stating that he felt the law would serve as a "historic step forward in the field of civil rights." Also within this statement, he emphasized the importance of certain provisions put forth by the law. He also discussed his predictions of what favorable outcomes would occur in result of these provisions:

Of Title II: "By authorizing the FBI to investigate certain bombings or attempted bombings of schools, churches and other structures, the Act will deter such heinous acts of lawlessness."

Of Title VI: "It holds great promise of making the Fifteenth Amendment of the Constitution fully meaningful."

Legislative history

House of Representatives
The bill, H.R. 8601, began in the House of Representatives under jurisdiction of the House Judiciary Committee, which was chaired by Representative Emanuel Celler of Brooklyn. The bill was initially introduced to the House on August 10, 1959. The bill was swiftly approved by the Judiciary Committee, but the Rules Committee attacked the Judiciary Committee to prevent the bill coming to the floor of the House of Representatives, and the bill remained stagnant for six months as a result. Hoping to prompt further action on the bill, Celler filed a discharge position to bypass the Rules Committee, as he felt that the Rules Committee intended to pigeonhole the bill. The petition originally required a majority (219) of House signatures, but was instituted prematurely with 209 signatures.

The "voter referees" plan was part of a House amendment to the original bill to substitute Representative Robert Kastenmeier's "enrollment officers" plan. After several amendments, the House of Representatives approved the bill on March 24, 1960 by a vote of 311–109.179 Democrats and 132 Republicans voted Aye. 93 Democrats, 15 Republicans, and 1 Independent Democrat voted Nay. 2 Democrats and 1 Republican voted present.

Senate
The bill was referred to the Senate on Mar. 24, 1960. The Senate's Judiciary Committee also faced attempts to dislodge the bill. Southern Democrats had long acted as a voting bloc to resist or reject legislation to enforce constitutional rights in the South and made it difficult for civil rights proponents to add strengthening amendments. In January 1960, Liberal Democrats pushed for a petition to discharge the consideration of the act.

After adding amendments to the bill, the Senate approved H.R. 8601 on April 8, 1960 by a vote of 71–18. 42 Democrats and 29 Republicans voted Aye. 18 Democrats voted Nay. No Republican Senators voted against the bill.  Despite large opposition from Southern Democrats, the Democratic U.S. Senators from Tennessee and Texas would vote in favor. The House of Representatives approved the Senate amendments on April 21, 1960 by a vote of 288-95. The bill was then signed into law by President Eisenhower on May 6, 1960.

Titles

Title I—obstruction of court orders
Title I which amended Chapter 17 of title 18 of the United States Code, outlawed obstruction of court orders. It introduced criminal penalties for all willful attempts to interfere with the due exercise of rights or the performance of duties under any court order. If convicted, one could be fined no more than $1,000, imprisoned for up to one year, or both.

Title II—flight from prosecution, explosives, threats and false information
Title II outlawed fleeing a state for damaging or destroying a building or property, illegal possession or use of explosives, and threats or false threats to damage property using fire or explosives.

Section 201 amended Chapter 49 of title 18. The amendment outlaws interstate or international movement to avoid prosecution for damaging or destroying any building or structure. The section also outlaws flight to avoid testimony in a case relating to such an offense. If convicted, one could be fined no more than $5,000 and/or imprisoned for no more than five years.

Section 203 amended Chapter 39 of title 18. The amendment dealt with the illegal use or possession of explosives. The section outlaws transportation or possession of any explosive with intent to damage a building or property. The section also makes the conveying of false information or threats to damage or destroy any building or property illegal.

Title III—federal election records
Section 301 calls for the preservation of all election records and papers which come into an officer or custodian's possession relating to poll tax or other act regarding voting in an election (except Puerto Rico). If an officer fails to comply, he/she could be fined no more than $1,000 and/or imprisoned for no more than one year. Section 302 declares that any person that intentionally alters, damages, or destroys a record shall be fined no more than $1,000 and/or imprisoned for no more than one year. Section 304 establishes that no person shall disclose any election record. Section 306 defines the term "officer of election".

Title IV—extension of powers of the civil rights commission
Section 401 of Title IV amended Section 105 of the Civil Rights Act of 1957 by declaring in an added subsection that "each member of the Commission shall have the power and authority to administer oaths or take statements of witnesses under affirmation."

Title V—education of children of members of armed forces
Title V amended section 6 of Public Law 874 of the Federal Impact Aid. As amended, Title V arranged for free education for children of members of the armed forces in the case that they were residing on Federal property wherein local academic institutions were unable to provide such education.

Title VI—protection of voting rights
Title VI amended section 131 of the Civil Rights Act of 1957 to address the issue of depriving African-Americans the right to vote.

Section 601 declares that those given the legal right to vote shall not be deprived of that right on account of race or color. Any person denying that right shall "constitute contempt of court."  The section also states that the courts can appoint "voting referees" to report to the court their findings of voting infringement. The section also defines the word "vote" as the entire process of making a vote effective--registration, casting a ballot, and having that ballot counted.

Title VII—separability
Title VII established the separability of the act, affirming that the rest of the act shall go unaffected if one provision is found invalid.

Subsequent history
The Civil Rights Act of 1960, being the fifth American civil rights law enacted, foreshadowed an increased emphasis on civil rights legislation and paved the way for subsequent civil rights laws in 1964 and 1965. Before the Civil Rights Act of 1964 and Voting Rights Act of 1965, the act of 1957 and the Civil Rights Act of 1960 were deemed ineffective for the firm establishment of civil rights. The later legislation had firmer ground for the enforcement and protection of a variety of civil rights, where the acts of 1957 and 1960 were largely limited to voting rights.

The Civil Rights Act of 1960 dealt with race and color but omitted coverage of those discriminated against for national origin, although Eisenhower had called for it in his message to Congress. Eisenhower also proposed extending the life of the Civil Rights Commission, which was unfulfilled in the Civil Rights Act of 1960, but was later instituted in the Civil Rights Act of 1964. The Civil Rights Act of 1964 and Voting Rights Act of 1965 worked to fulfill the seven goals suggested by President Eisenhower in 1959. These two subsequent laws, as well as the Civil Rights Act of 1968, satisfied proponents of the civil rights movement to end state-sponsored racial discrimination and protect legal equality in the United States.

See also
Civil and political rights
Reconstruction era
Jim Crow laws
Civil rights movement
Civil Rights Act of 1957
Civil Rights Act of 1968

References

External links
Resource.org
Cornell.edu
Cornell.edu
Cornell.edu
 106 Congressional Record (Bound) - Volume 106, Part 5 (March 15, 1960 to March 29, 1960), Congressional Record House March 24 vote roll call p. 6512
 106 Congressional Record (Bound) - Volume 106, Part 6 (March 30, 1960 to April 19, 1960), Congressional Record Senate April 8 vote roll call pp. 7810–7811
 106 Congressional Record (Bound) - Volume 106, Part 7 (April 20, 1960 to May 5, 1960), Congressional Record House April 21 amendment vote roll call pp. 8507–8508

1960 in American law
Civil rights movement
Anti-discrimination law in the United States
Civil Rights Acts
Anti-racism in the United States
86th United States Congress